The Oncology Nursing Foundation is a national nonprofit, tax-exempt, charitable organization in the United States, established on November 27, 1981, by the Oncology Nursing Society. The Pittsburgh-based organization is dedicated to sustaining and advancing oncology nursing and funded by corporate and private donations.

The Oncology Nursing Foundation awards both oncology nursing academic scholarships and oncology nursing research grants. Funding is also awarded for leadership, academic, lectureships, and career development, as well as cancer public education projects and scholarships to the ONS Congress, Institutes of Learning, and APN Conferences.

See also 
 Oncology Nursing Society
 Oncology Nursing Certification Corporation

References

External links 
 

Nursing organizations in the United States
Cancer organizations based in the United States
Medical and health organizations based in Pennsylvania